The 4th constituency of Charente was one of four French legislative constituencies in the Charente département between 1988 and 2010. Following constituency reviews, the constituency was abolished prior to the 2012 legislative election, leaving three constituencies in Charente.

Description
The constituency was defined in the Pasqua re-distribution of 1986.
It covered the following (pre-2015) cantons;
 Angoulême-Nord
 Gond-Pontouvre
 Montembœuf
 La Rochefoucauld
 Ruelle-sur-Touvre
 Soyaux

Deputies

From 2012 to 2017, Martine Pinville represented Charente's 1st constituency.

References

Defunct French legislative constituencies